William B. Manlove Jr. (born February 5, 1933) is a former American football coach.  He served as the head football coach at Widener University from 1969 to 1991, at Delaware Valley College from 1992 to 1995, and at La Salle University from 1997 to 2001, compiling a career college football coaching record of 212–111–1.  Manlove led Widener to two NCAA Division III Football Championships, in 1977 and 1981.  He served as president of the American Football Coaches Association (AFCA) in 1991.  He was inducted into the College Football Hall of Fame in 2011.

Early life
Manlove was born in Barrington, New Jersey, and graduated from Haddon Heights High School in 1951.  After serving in the United States Army, he received a Bachelor of Science in education in 1958 and a master's degree in 1960 from Temple University.

Coaching career
Manlove was an assistant coach at Gloucester City Junior-Senior High School in Gloucester City, New Jersey from 1957 to 1959 and was head coach from 1960 to 1965.  He was head coach at Oakcrest High School from 1965 to 1966. In 1967 and 1968 he was assistant coach at Lafayette College.

In 1969 Manlove began as head coach at Widener University, then called PMC Colleges.  He had a 2–7 record the first season, but never had a losing season again at Widener.  He accumulated a 182–53–1 record in 22 seasons and won two Division III national titles and 10 Middle Atlantic Conference titles.  Manlove was named Division III Coach of the Year in 1977.

In 2006 and 2007 he coached the U.S. team in the Aztec Bowl, winning both games.  In 2009 he was inducted into The Pennsylvania Sports Hall of Fame.

Head coaching record

College

See also
 List of college football coaches with 200 wins
 List of presidents of the American Football Coaches Association

References

External links
 

1933 births
Living people
Delaware Valley Aggies football coaches
Haddon Heights Junior/Senior High School alumni
Lafayette Leopards football coaches
La Salle Explorers football coaches
Widener Pride football coaches
High school football coaches in New Jersey
College Football Hall of Fame inductees
Temple University alumni
United States Army soldiers
People from Barrington, New Jersey